Michael Vingerling (born 28 June 1990 in Dirksland) is a Dutch track and road cyclist.

Major results

2006
 National Junior Track Championships
1st  Keirin
1st  Madison (with Nick Stöpler)
1st  Sprint
2007
 1st  Scratch, UEC European Junior Track Championships
 National Junior Track Championships
1st  Individual pursuit
1st  Kilo
1st  Madison (with Nick Stöpler)
1st  Points race
1st  Scratch
1st  Sprint
 1st  Road race, National Junior Road Championships
2008
 1st  Scratch, UCI Junior Track World Championships
 2nd Madison, National Track Championships (with Nick Stöpler)
 2nd Omloop Het Volk Juniors
2009
 National Track Championships
1st  Madison (with Nick Stöpler)
1st  Scratch
2nd Sprint
3rd Kilo
2010
 1st  Omnium, National Track Championships
2011
 3rd Individual pursuit, National Track Championships
2012
 National Track Championships
1st  Omnium
2nd Madison (with Dylan van Baarle)
2013
 2nd Baronie Breda Classic
 4th Zuid Oost Drenthe Classic I
2014
 1st  Scratch, National Track Championships
 2nd Arnhem–Veenendaal Classic
2015
 1st  Sprints classification Three Days of De Panne
 3rd Madison, National Track Championships (with Melvin van Zijl)

See also
 List of Dutch Olympic cyclists

References

External links

1990 births
Living people
Dutch male cyclists
People from Dirksland
Dutch cyclists at the UCI Track Cycling World Championships
Cyclists from South Holland
20th-century Dutch people
21st-century Dutch people